Jablanica is a town and municipality located in Herzegovina-Neretva Canton of the Federation of Bosnia and Herzegovina, an entity of Bosnia and Herzegovina. It is situated on the Neretva river and Jablanica lake.

Municipality

The municipality of Jablanica is a major tourist destination in Bosnia and Herzegovina. The municipality offer a wide variety of activities. The surrounding mountains such as Plasa, Čvrsnica and Prenj offer both hunting grounds and a variety of hiking trails. One popular hiking destination is "Hajdučka Vrata", a natural wonder, the product of wind erosion, located 2,000 meters above sea level on the mountain of Čvrsnica.

Risovac is a settlement in the municipality, located on a plateau outside of the city, it has several attractions. It is the site of two necropolises, both locations filled with medieval tombstones known as Stećci. Stećci necropolises are characteristic and most prevalent in Bosnia and Herzegovina. Risovac has a ski center attracting winter tourists.

The Jablanica Lake (Jablaničko Jezero) is a very important resource. The lake borders many of its settlements and is used for several purposes. The lake is used to generate electricity while it also serves as a top summer destination for fishing, swimming, water sports and other activities. Notable settlements include Ostrožac, which hosts the start of the annual rowing marathon and Donje Paprasko, the location of a public beach and the host of the marathon finish line.

Geography

Some 69% of the municipalities  of area is forested. The Jablanica lake is an important geographical as well as economic presence in Jablanica.

Settlements

Demographics

2013
10,111 total
9,045 Bosniaks (89.46%)
726 Croats (7.18%)
63 Serbs (0.62%)
277 others (2.74%)

Governance
The main local government of the municipality is Municipal Council of Jablanica. Council has 19 members elected for a four-year term by proportional representation. Jablanica also has its municipal mayor who is the highest-ranking officer in the municipal government.

Structure of the Council

History

During the Battle of the Neretva in 1943, Jablanica was the site of a successful raid by a group of Partisans led by Josip Broz Tito. A rail bridge over the river was blown up while a train was in the middle of crossing.  There is a park and monument commemorating this action at the site.  The bridge section and the locomotive which can still be seen in the river gorge are the remains of a film set depicting the battle, from the 1960s.

Notable people
Vahid Halilhodžić, former football player, football manager
Senad Lulić, footballer
Hasan Salihamidžić, footballer
Mirza Teletović, basketball player
Jasmin Šćuk, footballer

Twin towns – sister cities

Jablanica is twinned with:
 Başiskele, Turkey
 Gevgelija, North Macedonia
 Inđija, Serbia
 Paraćin, Serbia

References

External links

 Official website

 
Populated places in Jablanica, Bosnia and Herzegovina